Andreas Papadopoulos may refer to:
 Andreas Papadopoulos (sailor)
 Andreas Papadopoulos (politician)